On 12 September 1956 Croatia hosted Indonesia in an international friendly in Zagreb. Until the 1990 match against the United States, this was Croatia's only match against a foreign national team while it was a part of the Socialist Federal Republic of Yugoslavia.

Background
Indonesia previously played Yugoslavia at JNA Stadium in Belgrade on 9 September. Yugoslavia won the match 4–2.

Match details

Squads

See also
1990 Croatia v United States soccer match

Footnotes

Indonesia 1956
Croatia 1956
International association football matches
1956 in Indonesian sport
1956–57 in Croatian football
September 1956 sports events in Europe